Juanma López may refer to:

Juanma López (footballer) (born 1969), Spanish footballer
Juan Manuel López (boxer) (born 1983), Puerto Rican boxer